The following is a list of notable dark rock bands:


A
 Anathema
 The Awakening
 ALT-J

B
 Bullet for My Valentine
 Big John Bates Noirchestra

C
 City of Caterpillar

D
 Destiny
 Duotang

E
 Entwine
 Evanescence

F
 Fields of the Nephilim

G
 Grinderman

H
 Hedningarna
 HIM

K
 Katatonia

L
 Lapko
 Lorelei
 Lycia

M
 Madrugada

N
 Nine Inch Nails

P
 Paradise Lost
 Phase
 Planes Mistaken for Stars

R
 Roterfeld

S
 Sheila Divine
 She Wants Revenge
 Stabbing Westward

T
 The Warlocks
 The Beauty of Gemina

W
 Wolf Parade

X
 Xiu Xiu

Z
 Zeraphine

References

Lists of rock musicians by subgenre